The Bangladesh Intelligence Community is a group of several intelligence agencies charged with carrying out intelligence-gathering activities considered necessary for the conduct of foreign relations and national security of Bangladesh including other functions vital for the national security of Bangladesh. Member organizations of the Bangladesh intelligence community include military intelligence of Bangladesh Army, Navy, Air Force, National Police and civilian intelligence and analysis offices within executive ministries. The I.C. is headed by a Director heading each Intelligence agency, who reports to the Prime Minister of the Bangladesh.The organisation and structure of the modern Bangladesh intelligence community has developed its structures from agencies that continued to function after Independence from Pakistan. Bangladesh intelligence agencies today are the National Security Intelligence, the Special Branch, Army Intelligence, Air Force Intelligence, Naval Intelligence and the Directorate General of Forces Intelligence (DGFI). During the 1971 Bangladesh Independence War, the Bangladesh Forces in the 11 BDF Sectors also developed an intelligence network within its organisation of guerrilla combat teams that provided the sectors with essential local intelligence. However, the intelligence agency personnel have been and still continues to be recruited and trained from within the particular agency. Among their varied responsibilities, the members of the Community collect and produce foreign and domestic intelligence, contribute to military planning, and perform espionage.

National Security Intelligence

The National Security Intelligence, also known as the Directorate-General of National Security Intelligence is the principal intelligence agency of Bangladesh responsible for internal security (including internal political affairs), foreign intelligence and counterintelligence. Although distinct from the Military of Bangladesh, it is sometimes led by a retired senior military officer. It reports directly to the Prime Minister of Bangladesh and is administered from the Prime Minister's Office. Major responsibilities of this agency are to meet up any intelligence required from government, registration and control of foreigners, perform verification role, give protection to the VIPs & VVIPs

Directorate General of Forces Intelligence

The Directorate General of Forces Intelligence (DGFI) is the main military intelligence outfit, responsible for intelligence gathering for all military purposes. The DGFI also includes subdivisions specifically serving the Bangladesh Army, the Bangladesh Navy and the Bangladesh Air Force, but the agency itself is distinct and unified for all military intelligence functions. It is also responsible for policing the ranks within the services in light of Bangladesh's history.

Special Branch 

The Special Branch (SB) of the Bangladesh Police is the country's first intelligence agency. Major responsibilities of this branch are to meet up any intelligence required from government, registration and control of foreigners, perform verification role, give protection to the VIPs intelligence gathering, immigration controls etc. This is the only intelligence outfit of Bangladesh which works in all strategic, operational and tactical levels. It reports directly to the Prime Minister of Bangladesh.

Police Bureau of Investigation

Police Bureau of Investigation  is a specialized unit of Bangladesh Police. It was formed on 18 Sep 2012 to investigate "sensational" and difficult cases.

Criminal Investigation Department

CID is a specialized wing of the Bangladesh Police. It carries out investigations into crimes, including terrorism, murders and organized crime. It also gives forensic support.

References

 
Law enforcement in Bangladesh
Intelligence communities